Chern is the name of several inhabited localities in Russia.

Urban localities
Chern, Tula Oblast, a work settlement in Chernsky District of Tula Oblast

Rural localities
Chern, Oryol Oblast, a selo in Lomovetsky Selsoviet of Trosnyansky District of Oryol Oblast
Chern, Smolensk Oblast, a village in Slobodskoye Rural Settlement of Ugransky District of Smolensk Oblast